Michael George "Chick" Churchill (born 2 January 1946) is an English keyboard player of the late 1960s to 1970s blues rock band Ten Years After.

Career
Churchill began playing the piano at the age of six and studied classical music until he was fifteen. He became interested in blues and rock music, and joined his first band Sons of Adam in Nottingham. Churchill then met Alvin Lee of The Jaybirds. At first, Churchill joined the band as its road manager, but he soon became the keyboard player.
In November 1966 there was a name change to Ten Years After. With this group, Churchill played at major rock festivals including Woodstock in 1969, and the Isle of Wight Festival on 29 August 1970.

In 1973 he recorded a solo album You and Me featuring Rick Davies and Roger Hodgson of Supertramp and Martin Barre of Jethro Tull.(Chrysalis 1051) Vinyl, 7", 45 RPM, Promo 

Ten Years After broke up in 1976 and Churchill became Professional Manager at Chrysalis Music; the company was then owned by his manager, Chris Wright. In 1977, he left to found Whitsett Churchill Music Publishing with Tim Whitsett, publishing and promoting American artists, especially from the south.

Solo Album

 You And Me-1973 - With Roger Hodgson, Cozy Powell, Rick Davies and Martin Barre.

References

External links

Biography
Chick Churchill MySpace

1946 births
Living people
20th-century English musicians
21st-century English musicians
English rock keyboardists
English record producers
English songwriters
English rock musicians
English blues musicians
Blues rock musicians
British blues (genre) musicians
British rhythm and blues boom musicians
People from Ilkeston
Ten Years After members
Decca Records artists
Deram Records artists
Columbia Records artists
Chrysalis Records artists